Nashua Street Park is a park in Boston, along the Charles River, in the U.S. state of Massachusetts.

External links
 
 Nashua Street Park at the Landscape Architect's Guide to Boston, American Society of Landscape Architects
 Nashua Street Park at Halvorson Design

Parks in Boston
West End, Boston